Oxyopes shweta is a species of lynx spider. This spider is distributed in India and China.

Description
An active hunter and is commonly seen in green leaves of plants actively searching for prey.

References

Oxyopidae
Spiders of the Indian subcontinent
Spiders of China
Spiders described in 1970